Ocean Princess may refer to the following cruise ships:

 , operated by Princess Cruises 2000–2002
 

Ship names